ATS-2 (Applications Technology Satellite) was a communications satellite launched by NASA on April 6, 1967, on an Atlas-Agena D rocket from Cape Canaveral.

Objectives 

The ATS-2 had the following objectives: test new concepts in spacecraft design, propulsion and stabilization; capture high quality images of cloud cover; collect data measurements in an aerospace environment; and test improved communication systems.

Features 

The surface of the satellite was covered by solar panels, and it utilized gravity-gradient stabilization for control.

Experiments 

The following 12 experiments were conducted:

 Radio astronomy
 Magnetospheric electric fields
 Electron magnetic spectrometer deflection
 Particle telescope
 Omnidirectional proton and electron detectors
 Very low frequency (VLF) receiver
 Earth's albedo (DoD)
 Microwave communication transponder (Hughes Co.)
 Gravity-Gradient Stabilization (General Electric Co)
 Advanced Vidicon Camera System (AVCS)
 Thermal coating degradation
 Solar cell degradation

Mission 
The launch of ATS-2 went entirely according to plan up to the first Agena burn. When the second burn was initiated, the Agena engine failed to restart and thus the satellite could not be placed in the correct orbit. Postflight investigation found that the oxidizer isolation valve had failed to close after the first burn. This valve was supposed to prevent propellant from escaping the tanks and filling the turbopump during the coasting phase, but since it remained open, the pump developed vapor lock and thus it became impossible to pump oxidizer in. A tiny amount of ISP was generated by the gas generator igniter cartridge. The low periapsis of the orbit caused the satellite to tumble more than the stabilization system could compensate, which complicated its mission. The satellite still produced some usable data from the experiments, most notably those regarding cosmic rays and particles. It reentered the atmosphere on September 2, 1969.

References

External links 

 ATS, Past NASA Missions
 ATS, NASA Science Missions

1967 in spaceflight
NASA satellites orbiting Earth
Applications Technology Satellites